Shizuoka can refer to:
 Shizuoka Prefecture, a Japanese prefecture
 Shizuoka (city), the capital city of Shizuoka Prefecture
 Shizuoka Airport
 Shizuoka Domain, the name from 1868 to 1871 for Sunpu Domain, a predecessor of Shizuoka Prefecture
 Shizuoka Temple, a fictional temple in the 2009 video game Contra Rebirth